The following lists events in the year 2018 in Tunisia.

Incumbents
 President: Beji Caid Essebsi
 Prime Minister: Youssef Chahed
 President of the Assembly of the Representatives by the People: Mohamed Ennaceur

Events

January
January 8 – During protests over rising taxes and prices, a protester is killed and five others are injured in clashes with security police in the town of Tebourba.
January 10 – Hundreds of protesters are arrested as protests against economic conditions continue to spread across the country. 49 police officers are injured during clashes. A Jewish school is also firebombed on the island of Djerba.

References

 
Tunisia
2010s in Tunisia
Years of the 21st century in Tunisia
Tunisia